Ziva Ben-Porat is a literary theorist, writer, and editor who lives in Israel and is a professor at Tel Aviv University.

Personal life
Ben-Porat graduated with a bachelor's degree in English and Hebrew literature and a master's degree in English literature from Tel Aviv University, as well as a doctorate in comparative literature from University of California, Berkeley.

She lived for many years in Re'im, a kibbutz in southern Israel.

Work
According to Jeremy Dauber, in Ben-Porat's notable 1976 publication, "The Poetics of Literary Allusion", she sought to "deploy a formal notion of allusive signification to frame specific readings of literary works." From 1993 to 2008, Ben-Porat was editor-in-chief of Sifrut/Mashmaut/Tarbut (English: Literature/Meaning/Culture), a series of academic books published by HaKibbutz HaMeuchad in Hebrew. From 2000 to 2008, she was director of The Porter Institute for Poetics and Semiotics. She was vice president of FILLM (Federation Internationale de Langues et Litteratures Modernes / International Federation for Modern Language and Literatures) from 2002 to 2005. She is currently a poetry and comparative literature professor at Tel Aviv University. Her academic work includes a focus on cognitive intertextuality, cultural memory, and cultural representations. Ben-Porat also works on CULTOS, a digital library of multimedia linked on the basis of their intertextual relations.

Publications
Publications that Ben-Porat has been published in or involved with include:
 "The Poetics of Literary Allusion", PTL 1, 1976
 Poetics Today, "Method in Madness: Notes on the Structure of Parody, based on Mad\s T.V. Satires", 1979
 Lyrical Poetry & the Lyrics of Pop, Tel-Aviv (Hebrew), 1989
 Literary Pragmatics, "Two Way Pragmatics: From World to Text and Back", London, 1991
 Autumn in Hebrew Poetry, Tel-Aviv (Hebrew), 1991
 Poetics Today, "Poetics of the Homeric Similie and Theory of [Poetic] Similie.", 1993
 The Psychology and Sociology of Literature, "Sad Autumn' and Cultural Representations: A Comparative Study of Japanese and Israeli 'Autumn", 2001
 Journal of Romance Studies, London, 2003

Activism
In August 2010, she signed a letter, along with over 150 other academics, supporting a boycott by nearly 60 theatre professionals of a cultural center built in the West Bank settlement of Ariel. They also vowed not to lecture or participate in any discussions in the settlements, stating in their letter, "We will not take part in any kind of cultural activity beyond the Green Line, take part in discussions and seminars, or lecture in any kind of academic setting in these settlements." They explained their action by stating, "We'd like to remind the Israeli public that like all settlements, Ariel is also in occupied territory. If a future peace agreement with the Palestinian authorities puts Ariel within Israel's borders, then it will be treated like any other Israeli town."

In February 2015, Ben-Porat joined four others in resigning as a judge of the Israel Prize for Literature after the office of the Prime Minister of Israel vetoed two people who had been nominated to also serve as judges. In the resignation letter from Ben-Porat and four other judges, they said the action by the Prime Minister's office constituted “politicization of Israel’s most important prize, which is supposed to be granted solely on the basis of professional and artistic considerations,” and raised concerns that the award would be tainted.

References

External links
 Work biography

Living people
Tel Aviv University alumni
English literary critics
British women literary critics
Israeli editors
Israeli women editors
Israeli literary critics
British editors
British women editors
Academic staff of Tel Aviv University
Intertextuality
UC Berkeley College of Letters and Science alumni
Year of birth missing (living people)